Lagoon is an Africanfuturist novel by Nnedi Okorafor (2014, Hodder & Stoughton; 2015, Saga Press/Simon & Schuster). It has drawn much scholarly attention since its publication, some of which was written before Okorafor's important clarification that her work is "Africanfuturist" rather than "Afrofuturist." In 2014 it was chosen as an honor list title for the James Tiptree Jr. Award.

Summary
According to Hugh Charles O'Connell:

Lagoon develops its ... narrative across three acts: "Welcome" (in which the aliens make contact with the people of Lagos), "Awakening" (an explosion of violence across the city after contact is made), and "Symbiosis" (a period of utopian transformation, in which the aliens and humans come together to form a new postcapitalist Nigeria). Across these three acts, the novel's primary plot revolves around the alien ambassador, Ayodele, and her interactions with three human protagonists: Adaora, a marine biologist; Agu, a Nigerian soldier; and Anthony, a Ghanaian hip-hop artist. Blending its SF topoi with fantasy and folklore elements, we learn that the three human protagonists have special abilities (Adaora can create a shield around herself and breathe underwater, Agu has superhuman strength, and Anthony can make his voice heard and understood at great distances). Alongside these fantastical powers, the novel also incorporates various Nigerian folkloric and mythical entities, which physically manifest themselves and interact with the material world after being awakened by the aliens in the second act. Such figures include Udide Okwanka, a trickster spider and master weaver of tales from Igbo folklore; Legba, the Yoruba trickster god of language and the crossroads who is recast as an expert 419 scammer, but who also shows up in spirit form as Papa Legba; and new figures such as the Bone Collector, a sentient stretch of the Lagos-Benin highway that attacks humans.

References

External links
 

Nigerian science fiction novels
2014 American novels
Novels set in Lagos
English-language novels
American science fiction novels
Africanfuturist novels
Novels by Nnedi Okorafor
2014 Nigerian novels
Hodder & Stoughton books